Delta County is a county located in the U.S. state of Texas. As of the 2020 census, its population was 5,230. Its county seat and largest city is Cooper. The county was founded in 1870 and is named for its triangular shape, which resembles the Greek letter delta.

Meanders of two forks of the Sulphur River formed its northern and southern boundaries and meet at its easternmost point. Delta County was one of 19 prohibition, or entirely dry, counties in the state of Texas. , Delta County is no longer a dry county.

Geography

Major highways
  State Highway 19
  State Highway 24
  State Highway 154

Adjacent counties
 Lamar County (north)
 Red River County (northeast)
 Franklin County (southeast)
 Hopkins County (south)
 Hunt County (southwest)
 Fannin County (northwest)

Communities

Cities
 Cooper
 Pecan Gap (small part in Fannin County)
 Commerce (majority in Hunt County)

Unincorporated communities

 Antioch
 Ben Franklin
* Enloe
 Jot 'Em Down
* Klondike
* Lake Creek

Ghost town
 Liberty Grove

Demographics

Note: the US Census treats Hispanic/Latino as an ethnic category. This table excludes Latinos from the racial categories and assigns them to a separate category. Hispanics/Latinos can be of any race.

The 2020 U.S. census determined that Delta County had a population of 5,320. Among its population, the racial and ethnic makeup was 80.10% non-Hispanic white, 5.97% African American, 0.80% Native American, 0.71% Asian, 0.10% Pacific Islander, 0.57% some other race, 4.23% multiracial, and 7.53% Hispanic or Latino of any race.

Politics
Delta County is represented in the Texas House of Representatives by Republican Larry Phillips of Sherman, Texas.

See also 

 List of counties in Texas
 Dry counties
 List of museums in North Texas
 Recorded Texas Historic Landmarks in Delta County

References

External links
 Delta County website
 Delta County Chamber of Commerce website
 Delta County in Handbook of Texas Online
 Delta County History at HistoricTexas.net
 Jot 'Em Down, Delta County, Texas data at Internet Accuracy Project

 
1870 establishments in Texas
Populated places established in 1870
Dallas–Fort Worth metroplex counties